Jundiaí is a train station on CPTM Line 7-Ruby, located in the district of Vila Arens in Jundiaí.

In the future, it should attend the Intercities Train line between Americana and Santos, being the first station with interchange to the railroad system of São Paulo.

History
Jundiaí station was opened by São Paulo Railway on 16 February 1867. At the beginning of the 1870s, with the construction of the Companhia Paulista de Estradas de Ferro trunk line from Jundiaí to Campinas, the station was its start point of the line, serving as a connection station between both SPR and Paulista lines. Since 1994, it's operated by CPTM and part of the Line 7-Ruby Operational Extension.

References

Companhia Paulista de Trens Metropolitanos stations
Railway stations opened in 1867